Jeong Yeon-sik (born 8 May 1993) is a South Korean rugby sevens player. He competed in the men's tournament at the 2020 Summer Olympics. He also represented South Korea at the 2022 Rugby World Cup Sevens in Cape Town, South Africa.

References

External links
 

1993 births
Living people
Male rugby sevens players
Olympic rugby sevens players of South Korea
Rugby sevens players at the 2020 Summer Olympics
Sportspeople from Incheon
Asian Games medalists in rugby union
Rugby union players at the 2014 Asian Games
Asian Games bronze medalists for South Korea
Medalists at the 2014 Asian Games